Emsisoft Ltd. (est. 2003) is a New Zealand-based anti-virus software distributed company. They are notable for decrypting ransomware attacks to restore data.

History 
Emsisoft is an anti-malware and cybersecurity software and consulting company founded in Austria in 2003 by Christian Mairoll.  The company makes anti-malware software and decryption tools used by companies and individuals to help them recover computer files encrypted in ransomware attacks. It also tracks and generates studies on ransomware attacks.

Mairoll, who serves as CEO, relocated to rural New Zealand in 2014, moving Emsisoft’s headquarters to the country, while its employees across Europe, Asia and the United States remained remote.

In 2019, Emsisoft donated decryption tools to Europol's No More Ransom project. The company’s decryption tools were also used to help resolve the Kaseya VSA ransomware attack,  DarkSide and BlackMatter ransomware attacks against dozens of companies across the U.S., Europe and Britain in 2021.

 Ireland’s National Cyber Security Centre used Emsisoft’s decryption tools in May 2021 to help the country’s health service department recover from a ransomware attack.

Technology 
The three versions of Emsisoft's anti-malware software are called Anti-Malware Home, Business Security and Enterprise Security. Emsisoft technology is said to have outscored competitors Kaspersky Lab and Norton AntiVirus because, according to CEO Christian Mairoll, the virtual company can recruit the best people around the world. In 2006 Emsisoft discovered Ransom32, the first JavaScript ransomware.

Controversy 
In early 2021 Emsisoft suffered a system breach. The cause of the breach was due to a configuration error which led to the release of a database containing log records generated by Emsisoft products and services to unauthorized third parties. After detecting the attack, Emsisoft implemented security mechanisms, including disconnecting the compromised system and investigated the incident using forensic analysis. Customers were notified of the breach and Emsisoft issued a public apology for the incident.

References 

New Zealand companies established in 2003
Nelson, New Zealand
Computer security companies
New Zealand brands